Martin Davis and Tim Pawsat were the defending champions, but Davis chose to compete at Sydney in the same week. Pawsat teamed up with Tobias Svantesson and lost in the first round to Luke Jensen and Richey Reneberg.

Steve Guy and Shuzo Matsuoka won the title by defeating John Letts and Bruce Man-Son-Hing 7–6, 7–6 in the final.

Seeds

Draw

Draw

References

External links
 Official results archive (ATP)
 Official results archive (WTA)

Doubles
ATP Auckland Open